Plodopitomnik is a rural locality (a selo) in Ullubiyevsky Selsoviet, Tarumovsky District, Republic of Dagestan, Russia. The population was 164 as of 2010. There are 3 streets.

Geography 
Plodopitomnik is located 24 km southeast of Tarumovka (the district's administrative centre) by road. Aybatkhanovskoye lesnichestvo is the nearest rural locality.

References 

Rural localities in Tarumovsky District